The 1978–79 Belgian Cup was the 24th season of the main knockout competition in Belgian association football, the Belgian Cup.

Final rounds
The final game was played at the Heysel Stadium between K. Beerschot V.A.C. and Club Brugge K.V., K. Beerschot V.A.C. winning 1–0.

References

Belgian Cup seasons
Cup